The Order of Sciences and Arts is an Egyptian presidential decoration.

History 
The order was established in accordance with Law No. 528 of 1953, which was amended by Law No. 12 of 1972. It is awarded to those who have provided excellent services in the fields of science, art and knowledge. The medal has three degrees.

Degrees 
The order is composed of the following classes of merit:

 First class - Grand Cordon
 Second class
 Third class

Notable recipients 

 Gazbia Sirry
 Khairy Shalaby
 Mostafa al-Feki
 Mohamed Fawzi
 Muhammad Abdul Qadir Abdullah
 Majid Tobia
 Salah Zulfikar
 Magda
 Samiha Ayoub
 Ahmed Mounib
 Mahmoud Yassin 
 Yusry Al-Jundi
 Faten Hamama
 Ezz El-Dine Zulficar
 Yehia Chahine
 Shadia
 Rushdy Abaza
 Hussein Muanis
 Ezzat El Alaili
 Mohamed Morsi Ahmed
 Zakaria Al-Hijjawi
 Ahmad Al-Sheikh
 Abdelhay Adib
 Qassem Abdo Qassem
 Muhammad Al-Jawadi
 Salah Mansour
 Aziza Muharram Fahim
 Mohamed Enani
 Ramzi Zaki
 Mahmoud Imam Nasr
 Muhammad Amin Mitakis
 Lotfy El Tanbouli
 Afaf Abdel Razek
 Fahmy El-Khouly
 Ali El Din Hilal

References and sources 

 World Medals Index, Republic of Egypt: Order of the Republic

Specific

Republic (Egypt), Order of the
Republic (Egypt), Order of the
Awards established in 1953